The Agusta A.103 was an Italian prototype single-seat light helicopter flown in October 1959. The pilot was enclosed by a perspex bubble with the engine at the rear and the tail rotor carried on an enclosed boom.

Specifications

See also

References

External links

 luftfahrt-archiv.de

Agusta aircraft
1950s Italian civil utility aircraft
1950s Italian helicopters
Aircraft first flown in 1959
Single-engined piston helicopters